Coigny is a former commune in the Manche department in Normandy in north-western France. On 1 January 2016, it was merged into the new commune of Montsenelle.

People linked to the commune
 Robert Jean Antoine de Franquetot de Coigny (1652–1704)
 François de Franquetot de Coigny (1670–1759), Marshal of France
 François-Henri de Franquetot de Coigny (1737–1821), Marshal of France

See also
Communes of the Manche department

References

External links

 Coigny's website 
 Château de Franquetot 
 Château de Coigny 
 The Church of Coigny 

Former communes of Manche